Viktor Edvin Nordin (born 31 January 1996) is a Swedish footballer who plays for Sandvikens IF as a midfielder.

Honours
Hammarby IF
 Superettan: 2014
Sweden U17
 FIFA U-17 World Cup third place: 2013

References

External links
 
  
 

1996 births
Living people
Association football midfielders
Hammarby Fotboll players
Allsvenskan players
Superettan players
Swedish footballers
Sweden youth international footballers
Footballers from Stockholm